Brian Vincent Street (24 October 1943 – 21 June 2017) was a professor of language education at King's College London and visiting professor at the Graduate School of Education in University of Pennsylvania. During his career, he mainly worked on literacy in both theoretical and applied perspectives, and is perhaps best known for his book Literacy in Theory and Practice (1984).

Biography
Born in Manchester to Dorothy Groves, a woman from a Russian Jewish background, Street was told his father, an Irish pilot, had died in action during the war. Street was adopted by Margaret Nellie Street and Harry Street; the family moved to Devon in 1945. The elder Street found work in a wool factory, where his adopted son suffered a serious eye injury at the age of 18.

Street was educated at the Christian Brothers Grammar School in Plymouth and read English and, for his doctorate, Anthropology at Oxford University; his PhD was supervised by Godfrey Lienhardt. In 1971, he took up a lectureship at the Mashhad University. From 1974, he taught social and cultural anthropology at the University of Sussex, assuming a post as Professor of Language and Education at King's College London and for more than fifteen years he supervised doctoral students and taught graduate workshops on ethnography, student writing in higher education and language and literacy at King's. He spent six months at the University of Pennsylvania in 1988, leading to a permanent appointment as a visiting professor in the Graduate School of Education. His summer schools at the Federal University of Minas Gerais in Belo Horizonte, Brazil continued until shortly before he died. He retired from his full-time post at KCL in 2010. Meanwhile, he continued an association with Sussex University, via the Mass-Observation archive housed there and research with Dorothy Sheridan.

In 2009, he was elected vice-president of the Royal Anthropological Institute (RAI) and has been Chair of the Education Committee of the RAI since 2006. Later in his career, he became involved in development projects in South Asia and Africa using ethnographic perspectives in training literacy and numeracy teachers in a programme known as LETTER (Learning Empowerment through Training in Ethnographic Research). He also worked with colleagues in Brazil with particular interest in ethnographic and academic literacies perspectives. A collection of papers (coedited with Judy Kalman) concerning Latin America was published in 2012.

Academic work
Street became one of the leading theoreticians within what has come to be known as New Literacy Studies (NLS), in which literacy is seen not just as a set of technical skills, but as a social practice that is embedded in power relations. Street developed his theory in opposition to leading literacy scholars at the time, including Jack Goody and Walter J. Ong. These, and other scholars, represented what Street called an "autonomous view of literacy", in which literacy is as a set of autonomous skills that can be learnt independently of the social context. The alternative view Street called "ideological", since it acknowledges literacy's context-dependent and power-laden nature.

Central to Street's conceptualisation of literacy was the distinction between literacy events and literacy practices. The term literacy events was coined by Shirley Brice Heath to refer to situations in which people engage with reading or writing. While literacy events refers to discrete situations, literacy practices refers to the larger systems which these events create within a community. Literacy practices are the patterns of literacy events in a society; different domains may have different literacy practices, as literacy has different functions within a society, across domains. Street defined literacy practices as the "broader cultural conception of particular ways of thinking about and doing reading and writing in cultural contexts."

The notion of literacy practices stems from Street's fieldwork in an Iranian mountain village, Cheshmeh, where he realised that people used literacy in different ways in different contexts, and for different purposes: maktab, schooled and commercial literacy practices. The uses and meanings of these were different: maktab literacy was associated with Koranic schools, schooled literacy with secularisation and modernisation, and commercial literacy with the fruit trade. The commercial literacy sprang out of the Koranic literacy practices, rather than schooled literacy practices as the dominant view of Literacy might expect and Street explains this by the status and authority the latter practice had within the village. Schooled literacy, on the other hand, although more technically developed, was oriented away from the village towards the cities. It was not the literacy skills as such, but the social functions associated with particular literacies, that influenced the development of commercial literacy in this village.

Later in his career Street worked on academic literacy and numeracy, and both areas can be said to reflect and build on his view of literacy. In several articles on academic literacy (most coauthored with Mary R. Lea) Street critiques the notion of academic literacy as a set of skills to give writings structure, content and clarity, and argues that this varies across disciplines, and that what is seen as "appropriate writing" is more closely tied to epistemologies and the underlying assumptions of different disciplines. The perspective of academic literacies acknowledges and takes into account the power and discourses within institutions and institutional production and representation of meaning.

Like literacy, Street (and his coauthors Dave Baker and Alison Tomlin) saw numeracy as a social practice that cannot be reduced to a set of technical skills. Rather, they turn the focus to social factors, particularly the similarities or differences between school and home numeracy practices, and the implications of these, including ideology, power relations, values, and social institutions. Street (and his coauthors) argued that some maths practices are privileged over others, and this has to do with the control and status associated with social institutions and procedures. In that sense, we can adopt a similar approach to numeracy practices as social and ideological that has been developed with regard to literacy.

Personal life and honours
Street married twice. Firstly to Joanna Lowry, whom he met while an academic at Sussex University; the couple had three now adult children, a son and two daughters, before separating in 1991. His second wife was Maria Lucia Castanheira, a professor at  Brazil's Federal University of Minas Gerais, whom he married in 2017. He was awarded the National Reading Conference's Distinguished Scholar Lifetime Achievement Award in 2008.

Death
Brian Street died in Hove on 21 June 2017 at the age of 73 from cancer.

Selected books

Selected articles and book chapters

References

1943 births
2017 deaths
Academics of King's College London
English anthropologists
Social anthropologists
University of Pennsylvania faculty